The Colony Historic District is a historic district at Gardner's Neck and Mattapoisett Roads at Mt. Hope Bay in Swansea, Massachusetts.  It includes seven summer cottages, most of which line Mattapoisett Road, which were built mainly between 1896 and 1930.  Architecturally, these cottages are all in Shingle or Colonial Revival, and are representative of the summer resort development of Swansea around the turn of the 20th century.

The district was added to the National Register of Historic Places in 1990.

See also
National Register of Historic Places listings in Bristol County, Massachusetts

References

Historic districts in Bristol County, Massachusetts
Colonial Revival architecture in Massachusetts
Shingle Style architecture in Massachusetts
National Register of Historic Places in Bristol County, Massachusetts
Swansea, Massachusetts
Historic districts on the National Register of Historic Places in Massachusetts